Eduardo José Magnín (born February 17, 1969) is an Argentine former football defensive player, mostly remembered for being dismissed by the English referee Gary Willard only after the showing of three yellow cards during a European club match.

Career
Magnín started his professional playing career in 1990 with Unión de Santa Fe, spent the 1994-95 season with San Martín de Tucumán before returning to Unión for two more years, and in 1997 he joined Club Atlético Huracán. After only one season with Huracán he joined CD Badajoz in Spain, and then spent one season (1999–2000) at FC Lausanne-Sports of Switzerland.

During this period he was involved in his most notable incident, coming in a UEFA Cup first round tie at the club's ground, the Stade Olympique de la Pontaise, in September 1999. The player received cautions in the 41st and 66th minutes of the game against Celta Vigo of Spain, the second of which should have resulted in an additional red card and the removal of the player from the pitch. However, the referee, Gary Willard of England, failed to realise that Magnín had been shown the first yellow card, and allowed play to continue with the player still present. When Magnín then earned a third yellow card four minutes later, he was finally shown red and dismissed. The match result (at 3-2 to Lausanne) was allowed to stand by UEFA, due to the club not having suffered a disadvantage by the incorrect application of the Laws of the game by Willard.

In 2000 Magnín returned to Argentina where he played once again for Unión and then for Nueva Chicago. In his later playing days he turned out for Deportivo Saprissa in Costa Rica, Olimpia of Paraguay, and finally Patronato de Paraná of the Regionalised Argentine 4th division. He is now officially retired.

References

External links
 Argentine Primera statistics
Pictures from Unión de Santa Fe

1969 births
Argentine footballers
People from San Jerónimo Department
Living people
Unión de Santa Fe footballers
Club Atlético Huracán footballers
CD Badajoz players
FC Lausanne-Sport players
Nueva Chicago footballers
Deportivo Saprissa players
Club Olimpia footballers
Expatriate footballers in Paraguay
Association football defenders
Sportspeople from Santa Fe Province
Unión de Santa Fe managers